200ER may refer to:
Boeing 767-200ER, aircraft variant
Boeing 777-200ER, aircraft variant
Bombardier CRJ-200ER, aircraft variant